Lee Seung-hui may refer to:
Lee Seung-hee (artist) (born 1963)
Sung-Hi Lee (born 1970), Korean American actress
Nikki S. Lee (born 1970), photographer
Lee Seung-hee (born 1988), footballer